Dendrolirium is a genus of orchids. Dendrolirium is abbreviated Ddlr. in the horticultural trade.

Species
, Plants of the World Online accepted the following species:
Dendrolirium andamanicum (Hook.f.) Schuit., Y.P.Ng & H.A.Pedersen
Dendrolirium calcareum (V.N.Long & Aver.) Schuit., Y.P.Ng & H.A.Pedersen
Dendrolirium ferrugineum (Lindl.) A.N.Rao
Dendrolirium kamlangensis (A.N.Rao) A.N.Rao
Dendrolirium laniceps (Rchb.f.) Schuit., Y.P.Ng & H.A.Pedersen
Dendrolirium lanigerum (Seidenf.) H.Jiang
Dendrolirium lasiopetalum (Willd.) S.C.Chen & J.J.Wood
Dendrolirium latilabellum (Seidenf.) Schuit., Y.P.Ng & H.A.Pedersen
Dendrolirium malipoense (Z.J.Liu & S.C.Chen) H.Jiang
Dendrolirium ornatum Blume
Dendrolirium sicarium (Lindl.) Schuit., Y.P.Ng & H.A.Pedersen
Dendrolirium tomentosum (J.Koenig) S.C.Chen & J.J.Wood

References

Eriinae
Podochileae genera